The AIM alliance, also known as the PowerPC alliance, was formed on October 2, 1991, between Apple, IBM, and Motorola. Its goal was to create an industry-wide open-standard computing platform based on the POWER instruction set architecture. It was intended to solve legacy problems, future-proof the industry, and compete with Microsoft's monopoly and the Wintel duopoly. The alliance yielded the launch of Taligent, Kaleida Labs, the PowerPC CPU family, the Common Hardware Reference Platform (CHRP) hardware platform standard, and Apple's Power Macintosh computer line.

History

Development

From the 1980s into the 1990s, the computer industry was moving from a model of just individual personal computers toward an interconnected world, where no single company could afford to be vertically isolated anymore. Infinite Loop says "most people at Apple knew the company would have to enter into ventures with some of its erstwhile enemies, license its technology, or get bought". Furthermore, Microsoft's monopoly and the Wintel duopoly threatened competition industrywide, and the Advanced Computing Environment (ACE) consortium was underway.

Phil Hester, a designer of the IBM RS/6000, convinced IBM's president Jack Kuehler of the necessity of a business alliance. Kuehler called Apple President Michael Spindler, who bought into the approach for a design that could challenge the Wintel-based PC. Apple CEO John Sculley was even more enthusiastic.

On July 3, 1991, Apple and IBM signed a non-contractual letter of intent, proposing an alliance and outlining its long-term strategic technology goals. Its main goal was creating a single unifying open-standard computing platform for the whole industry, made of a new hardware design and a next-generation operating system. IBM intended to bring the Macintosh operating system into the enterprise and Apple intended to become a prime customer for the new POWER hardware platform. Considering it to be critically poorly communicated and confusing to the outside world at this point, industry commentators nonetheless saw this partnership as an overall competitive force against Microsoft's monopoly and Intel's and Microsoft's duopoly. IBM and Motorola would have 300 engineers to codevelop chips at a joint manufacturing facility in Austin, Texas. Motorola would sell the chips to Apple or anyone else.

Between the three companies, more than 400 people had been involved to define a more unified corporate culture with less top-down executive decree. They collaborated as peers and future coworkers in creating the alliance and the basis of its ongoing future dialog which promised to "change the landscape of computing in the 90s".

Launch

On October 2, 1991, the historic AIM alliance was officially formed with a contract between Apple CEO John Sculley, IBM Research and Development Chief Jack Kuehler, and IBM Vice President James Cannavino. Kuehler said "Together we announce the second decade of personal computing, and it begins today" and Sculley said this would "launch a renaissance in technological innovation", as they signed the foot-high stack of papers comprising the contract. The New York Times called it "an act that a year ago almost no one in the computer world would have imagined possible". It was so sweeping that it underwent antitrust review by the United States federal government.

In 1992, Apple and IBM created two new companies called Taligent and Kaleida Labs as had been declared in the alliance contract, with the expectation that neither would launch any products until the mid-90s. Since 1988, Apple had already created a next-generation operating system, codenamed "Pink"; and Taligent Inc. was incorporated to bring Pink to market as the ultimate crossplatform object-oriented OS and application frameworks. Kaleida was to create an object-oriented, cross-platform multimedia scripting language which would enable developers to create entirely new kinds of applications that would harness the power of the platform. IBM provided affinity between its own Workplace OS and Taligent, replacing Taligent's microkernel with the IBM Microkernel and adopting Taligent's CommonPoint application framework into Workplace OS, OS/2, and AIX.

CISC microprocessors, including the mainstream Intel x86 products, were considered an evolutionary dead end, and that because RISC was the future, the next few years were a period of great opportunity.

The alliance's hardware is based on the PowerPC processorsthe first of which, the PowerPC 601, is a single-chip version of IBM's POWER1 CPU. Both IBM and Motorola would manufacture PowerPC integrated circuits for this new platform. The computer architecture base is called "PReP" (PowerPC Reference Platform), later complemented with OpenFirmware and renamed "CHRP" (Common Hardware Reference Platform). IBM used PReP and CHRP for the PCI version of IBM's RS/6000 platform, which was adapted from existing Micro Channel architecture models, and changed only to support the new 60x bus style of the PowerPC.

In 1994, Apple delivered its first alliance-based hardware platform, the PowerPC-based Power Macintosh line, on schedule as predicted by the original alliance contract. Infinite Loop considered the PowerPC to be five years too late to the overall market, "no more than a welcome offering to Apple's own market base", and further hamstrung by the legacy architecture of System 7.

Downturn
In 1995, IT journalist Don Tennant asked Bill Gates to reflect upon "what trend or development over the past 20 years had really caught him by surprise". Gates responded with what Tennant described as biting, deadpan sarcasm: "Kaleida and Taligent had less impact than we expected." Tennant believed the explanation to be that "Microsoft's worst nightmare is a conjoined Apple and IBM. No other single change in the dynamics of the IT industry could possibly do as much to emasculate Windows."

Efforts by Motorola and IBM to popularize PReP and CHRP failed when Apple, IBM, and Taligent all failed to provide a single comprehensive reference operating system for server and personal markets—mainly Taligent's OS or IBM's Workplace OS. Windows NT was the only OS with mainstream consumer recognition that had been ported to PowerPC, but there was virtually no market demand for it on this non-mainstream hardware. Although PowerPC was eventually supported by several Unix variants, Windows NT, and Workplace OS (in the form of OS/2), these operating systems generally ran just as well on commodity Intel-based hardware so there was little reason to use the PReP systems. The BeBox, designed to run BeOS, uses some PReP hardware but is overall incompatible with the standard. Kaleida Labs closed in 1995. Taligent was absorbed into IBM in 1998. Some CHRP machines shipped in 1997 and 1998 without widespread reception.

Relations between Apple and Motorola further deteriorated in 1998 with the return of Steve Jobs to Apple and his contentious termination of Power Macintosh clone licensing. Reportedly, a heated telephone conversation between Jobs and Motorola CEO Christopher Galvin resulted in the long-favored Apple being demoted to "just another customer", mainly for PowerPC CPUs. In retaliation, Apple and IBM briefly expelled Motorola from the AIM alliance, and forced Motorola to stop making PowerPC CPUs, leaving IBM to design and produce all future PowerPC chips. Motorola was reinstated into the alliance in 1999.

Legacy
The PowerPC is the clearest intended success that came out of the AIM alliance. From 1994 to 2006, Apple used PowerPC chips in almost every Macintosh. PowerPC also has had success in the embedded market, and in video game consoles: GameCube, Wii, Wii U, Xbox 360, and PlayStation 3.

After being reinstated into the AIM alliance, Motorola helped IBM to design some laptop PowerPC chips with IBM's manufacturing. In 2004, Motorola spun off its Semiconductor production as Freescale Semiconductor, and left the AIM alliance completely, leaving IBM and Apple in the alliance. Freescale continued to help IBM design PowerPC chips until Freescale was acquired and absorbed by NXP Semiconductors in 2015.

Apple transitioned entirely to Intel CPUs in 2006, due to eventual disappointment with the direction and performance of PowerPC development as of the G5 model, especially in the fast-growing laptop market. This was seen as the end of the AIM alliance as that left IBM as the sole user of PowerPC.

Taligent was launched from the original AIM alliance, based originally on Apple's Pink operating system. From Taligent came the CommonPoint application framework and many global contributions to internationalization and compilers, in the form of Java Development Kit 1.1, VisualAge C++, and the International Components for Unicode open source project.

Power.org was founded in 2004 by IBM and fifteen partners with intent to develop, enable, and promote Power Architecture technology, such as PowerPC, POWER, and software applications.

The OpenPOWER Foundation is a collaboration around Power ISA-based products initiated by IBM and announced as the "OpenPOWER Consortium" on August 6, 2013. It has more than 250 members. In 2019, IBM announced its open-sourcing of the Power ISA.

See also
 Advanced Computing Environment
 Advanced RISC Computing

References

 

1991 establishments in the United States
Apple Inc. partnerships
Former IBM subsidiaries
Motorola
Technology consortia